Welcome in Vienna is a 1986 Austrian drama film directed by Axel Corti. The film was selected as the Austrian entry for the Best Foreign Language Film at the 60th Academy Awards, but was not accepted as a nominee.

It is the third film in the director's six-hour, "Where To and Back" (Wohin und zurück) trilogy. It follows on from the first film, 1982's Wohin und zurück - God Does Not Believe In Us Anymore, and the second film, 1986's Wohin und zurück - Santa Fe.

"...The trilogy is loosely based on [writer] Troller’s life as a Viennese Jew who fled Europe as a teenager, emigrated to the United States, and returned to Europe during World War II as an American soldier. Each of these full length feature films – which are connected to each other by an advancing chronology and a series of overlapping characters – are meant to be viewed together...".

Cast
 Gabriel Barylli as Freddy Wolf
 Nicolas Brieger as Sgt. Adler
 Claudia Messner as Claudia
 Karlheinz Hackl as Treschensky
 Joachim Kemmer as Lt. Binder
 Hubert Mann as Capt. Karpeles
 Liliana Nelska as Russian woman
 Kurt Sowinetz as Stodola

See also
 List of submissions to the 60th Academy Awards for Best Foreign Language Film
 List of Austrian submissions for the Academy Award for Best Foreign Language Film

References

External links
 

1986 films
1986 drama films
Austrian drama films
1980s German-language films
Films directed by Axel Corti
Films set in 1944
Films set in 1945
Films set in 1946